The Ardchattan Priory was a Valliscaulian monastic community in Ardchattan, Argyll, Scotland. It was founded in  1230 by Duncan MacDougal, Lord of Argyll. From the early 14th century, the Prior of Ardchattan held the chantership of Lismore Cathedral. In April 1510 it was incorporated as a cell of Beauly Priory and may have become Cistercian, but the evidence is slight. It was annexed to the bishopric of the Isles in 1615.

Priory
The surviving elements of the priory buildings comprise remains of the original 13th-century church such as the south transept and its chapels plus traces of 15th and early 16th centuries additions such as the choir, burial aisles and a sacristy. The remains also shelter a number of carved stones. The priory structure, the burial ground and the carved stones have been collectively designated a scheduled ancient monument by Historic Environment Scotland.

Gardens
According to the Ardchattan Priory Gardens website, "a garden has existed at Ardchattan for over 700 years, since Valliscaulian monks, from a little known order in Burgundy, first settled here, on the north shore of Loch Etive. Facing south, with spectacular views over Loch Etive, one can look east to Ben Cruachan and west to the hills of Mull, the monks chose their site well."

There are a number of roses in the priory gardens, herbaceous borders, and over thirty varieties of trees. "On entering the garden, shrub walks lead off the main drive. The neutral soil and temperate climate allow a wide variety of plants to thrive: a huge Cornus kousa, Eucryphia glutinosa, Hoheria lyalii mingle with scented roses and philadelphus. A wild flower meadow planted under a variety of sorbus trees is a more recent addition. Extensive lawns are bordered by herbaceous beds, roses and a rockery."

The gardens are also listed by Historic Environment Scotland because of their high historical, horticultural and scenic value.

Yew Trees
"Ardchattan Priory whose yew trees (Taxus baccata), according to other accounts, were inspected by Robert the Bruce and cut to make at least some of the longbows used at the Battle of Bannockburn."

Burials
Séon Carsuel

Bibliography
 Cowan, Ian B. & Easson, David E., Medieval Religious Houses: Scotland With an Appendix on the Houses in the Isle of Man, Second Edition, (London, 1976), p. 83
 Watt, D.E.R. & Shead, N.F. (eds.), The Heads of Religious Houses in Scotland from the 12th to the 16th Centuries, The Scottish Records Society, New Series, Volume 24, (Edinburgh, 2001), pp. 10–1

See also
 Prior of Ardchattan

References

External links
Ardchattan Priory Gardens website

1230 establishments in Scotland
Religious organizations established in the 1230s
History of Argyll and Bute
History of the Scottish Highlands
Valliscaulian monasteries
Inventory of Gardens and Designed Landscapes
Christian monasteries established in the 13th century
Historic Scotland properties in Argyll and Bute
Scheduled Ancient Monuments in Argyll and Bute
Former Christian monasteries in Scotland